Delphine may refer to:

 Delphine (given name), list of people with the feminine given name
 Delphine (novel), an 1802 novel by Germaine de Staël
 Delphine (1931 film), a 1931 French film directed by Roger Capellani
 Delphine (2019 film), a 2019 Canadian film directed by Chloé Robichaud
 SS Delphine, a yacht built in 1921 by John and Horace Dodge
 Delphine Records, a French record label founded in 1976
 Delphine Software International, a defunct game development company
 Of or relating to dolphins
 Moderate Tropical Storm Delphine, in the 1969–70 South-West Indian Ocean cyclone season

See also
 Delphin (disambiguation)
 Delphian (disambiguation)
 Delphinine, an alkaloid